Greenwich Township is the name of some places in the U.S. state of New Jersey:
Greenwich Township, Cumberland County, New Jersey
Greenwich Township, Gloucester County, New Jersey
Greenwich Township, Warren County, New Jersey

May also refer to:

East Greenwich Township, New Jersey in Gloucester County

See also
Greenwich (CDP), New Jersey (disambiguation)
Greenwich Township (disambiguation)

New Jersey township disambiguation pages